Three Rock Rovers Hockey Club is a field hockey club based in Rathfarnham, South Dublin, Ireland. The club was founded in 1893. It was originally based in Foxrock and was named after Three Rock Mountain. The club's senior men's team plays in the Men's Irish Hockey League and the Men's Irish Senior Cup. The reserve team play in the Men's Irish Junior Cup. Three Rock Rovers have also represented Ireland in European competitions, including the Euro Hockey League. Three Rock Rovers also enters various men's and women's teams in junior, senior and veterans leagues and cup competitions affiliated to the Leinster Hockey Association.

History
Three Rock Rovers were founded in 1893 by a group of former Dublin University Hockey Club players. Together with Dublin University and Monkstown, Three Rock Rovers were among the pioneering field hockey clubs in Ireland. In 2008–09 Three Rock Rovers were founder members of the Men's Irish Hockey League.

EY Champions Trophy

Irish Senior Cup

Notes

Irish Junior Cup

Europe
Three Rock Rovers have also represented Ireland in European competitions. In addition to playing in the Euro Hockey League, Three Rock Rovers have also played in European indoor hockey competitions. Three Rock Rovers hosted the 2015 EuroHockey Club Trophy.

Women's field hockey

Irish Junior Cup

Home grounds
Three Rock Rovers were originally based in Foxrock, near the Stillorgan station on the Harcourt Street railway line. The club's original grounds were donated to Three Rock Rovers by Sir John Power of Power's Distillers. In 1930, Three Rock Rovers moved to Londonbridge Road, the headquarters of the Irish Hockey Union in Ringsend. In 1981 the club moved to its current grounds at  Grange Road in Rathfarnham, South Dublin.

Notable players

Men
 internationals
When Ireland won the silver medal at the 1908 Summer Olympics, the squad included five Three Rock Rovers players – Henry Brown, Walter Campbell, Richard Gregg, Henry Murphy and Charles Power.

 international
 David Judge: 1964 
 internationals
 Jody Hosking
 Richard Pautz  

Others
Gordon Lambert: member of Seanad Éireann

Women
 internationals
When the Ireland women's national field hockey team won the silver medal at the 2018 Women's Hockey World Cup, the squad included former Three Rock Rovers player Deirdre Duke.

 Deirdre Duke

Honours

Men
Men's Irish Hockey League
Runners Up: 2017–18, 2018–19: 2 
EY Champions Trophy
Winners: 2017, 2018, 2019: 3 
Irish Senior Cup
Winners: 1897–98, 1907–08, 1938–39, 1952–53, 1958–59, 1961–62, 1962–63, 1963–64, 1973–74, 2013–14, 2017–18, 2018–19: 12 
Runners Up: 1912, 1960, 1977, 1986, 1998, 1999: 6
Irish Junior Cup
Winners: 1897–98, 1909–10, 1911–12, 1919–20, 1978–79, 1997–98, 2018–19: 7 
Runners Up: 1964, 1977, 1983, 2000, 2015, 2017: 6
EuroHockey Indoor Club Challenge II
Winners: 2018: 1
EuroHockey Indoor Club Challenge I
Runners Up: 2019: 1
All-Ireland Club Championship
Winners: 2008: 1

Women
Irish Junior Cup
Runners Up: 2001, 2003: 2

References

External links
 Three Rock Rovers on Facebook
  Three Rock Rovers on Twitter

 
Field hockey clubs in County Dublin
Sports clubs in South Dublin (county)
Men's Irish Hockey League teams
1893 establishments in Ireland
Field hockey clubs established in 1893